Noah Scott Herron (born April 3, 1982) is a former American football running back. He was drafted by the Pittsburgh Steelers in the seventh round of the 2005 NFL Draft. He played college football at Northwestern.

Herron was also a member of the Cleveland Browns, Green Bay Packers, Tampa Bay Buccaneers, New York Jets, and New York Sentinels.

Early years
Noah attended high school at Mattawan High School in Mattawan, Michigan.

College career
Noah Herron attended Northwestern University and starred in football, where he was a consensus All-Big Ten Conference second-team honoree, the team Co-MVP, and Chicago Tribune Big Ten Conference Back of the Year. Overall, he finished his career with 462 carries for 2,524 yards (5.46 yards per car. avg.), and 26 touchdowns, 72 receptions for 781 yards (10.8 yards per reception) and 2 touchdowns, 16 kickoff returns for 231 yard (14.4 yards per kickoff ret. avg.), fourteen tackles, and one forced fumble.

Professional career
Herron was drafted by the Pittsburgh Steelers in the seventh round (244th overall) of the 2005 NFL Draft.

Green Bay Packers
He was signed off of the Steelers' practice squad by the Green Bay Packers. In his rookie season he rushed for 123 yards on 48 attempts for a 2.6-yard average and two touchdowns. Following the season, the Packers kept him as a third string back behind Ahman Green and Vernand Morency. In his second season, Herron rushed for 150 yards on 37 attempts for a 4.1-yard average to go with 29 receptions for 211 yards and three total touchdowns.

In the 2007 season, Herron was expected to compete with Morency and Brandon Jackson for the starting running back position. However, he was placed on Injured reserve with a sprained knee on September 2, ending his season.

Noah returned to the Packers during the 2008 training camp but was released on August 30 during final cuts.

Tampa Bay Buccaneers
Herron was signed by the Tampa Bay Buccaneers on November 19, 2008 after running back Earnest Graham was placed on injured reserve. He was released on December 17, 2008.

New York Jets
Herron was signed to a future contract by the New York Jets on January 7, 2009. He was released on February 26, 2009.

Cleveland Browns
Herron was signed by the Cleveland Browns on March 18, 2009.
He was released on September 5 during final roster cuts.

Personal life
In June 2008, Herron thwarted a would-be burglar by hitting him with a post he unscrewed from his bed. The injury resulted in the burglar being taken to the hospital. Herron was not injured during the break-in. A second burglary suspect was arrested at Herron's house during the incident.

References

External links
Just Sports Stats
Cleveland Browns bio
Northwestern Wildcats bio
Tampa Bay Buccaneers bio

1982 births
Living people
People from Van Buren County, Michigan
Players of American football from Milwaukee
Players of American football from Michigan
American football running backs
Northwestern Wildcats football players
Pittsburgh Steelers players
Green Bay Packers players
Tampa Bay Buccaneers players
New York Jets players
Cleveland Browns players
New York Sentinels players